The 2024 ICC Men's Under-19 Cricket World Cup is an international limited-overs cricket tournament that is scheduled to be held in Sri Lanka in 2024. It is the fifteenth edition of the tournament and the third to be held in Sri Lanka, after 2000 and 2006. Sri Lanka is the second country after New Zealand to host the tournament on three occasions. India are the defending champions.

Qualification

Eleven teams qualified automatically for the 2024 World Cup, while the remaining five teams will decided by regional qualifiers with one qualifier from each ICC development region. The first qualification tournament was the Europe Division 2 Qualifier played in August 2022.

Nepal became the first team to be qualified through regional qualifications by defeating their all time arch rival UAE on the Asia Qualifiers.

References

ICC Under-19 Cricket World Cup
International cricket competitions in Sri Lanka